Drayton is a community in Wellington County, Ontario, Canada. It is a part of the township of Mapleton. The village is on the corner of Wellington Road 8 and Wellington Road 11, geographically northwest of Fergus and southwest of Arthur.

History
In 1851, the community was named after Drayton Manor in Staffordshire, England. Drayton Manor was the home of Robert Peel, former Prime Minister of the United Kingdom.

Dining
Drayton offers both a restaurant, The Drayton Chophouse and a café, à la mode.

Education
Drayton is in the Upper Grand District School Board.  Both Centre Peel Public School and Drayton Heights Public School (K-8) service students from the Drayton area; while high school students attend Norwell District Secondary School in nearby Palmerston, Ontario. Drayton is also the home of Community Christian School, formerly known as Calvin Christian School.

Entertainment
Drayton is home to the Drayton Festival Theatre, which is a renovated 1902 Opera House that seats 375 people, and has a rich history of entertaining audiences with the finest talent in professional theatre, including legendary performers as Beatrice Lillie. Alex Mustakas is the CEO and Artistic Director of Drayton Entertainment.
Drayton hosts one branch of the Wellington County library system.

Healthcare
Located downtown Drayton, the Mapleton Health Centre's eight primary care physicians and four nurse practitioners service 15,000 patients.

Media
Drayton is serviced specifically by a local newspaper The Community News, in addition to the Wellington Advertiser, a publication serving the entirety of Wellington County.

Natural disasters

On June 23, 2017, Drayton and surrounding Wellington County towns declared a state of emergency due to flooding. Over 100 mm of rain fell within 24 hours. Many roads were closed and hundreds of basements were flooded.

Recreation
Drayton contains the PMD Arena as well as the agricultural fairgrounds, Kinsmen Park, Riverside Park, Centennial Park, and ABC Park. There are various soccer field and baseball diamonds located throughout Drayton. Children can play in official Drayton soccer, hockey, or baseball leagues as well as on many intramural teams in school.

References

External links
 Township of Mapleton: Area History
 Drayton Entertainment / Drayton Festival Theatre
Drayton at Geographical Names of Canada

Communities in Wellington County, Ontario
Former villages in Ontario